Trutnov Open Air Music Festival is one of the biggest music festivals in the Czech Republic. Its origins go back to 1987 when it was founded on the tradition of underground culture in the city of Trutnov. Since the Velvet Revolution the festival is held annually and attendance has risen from 1,800 in 1990 to 20,000 in 1995. Since 2013, the exact attendance has not been disclosed.

Festival 2004 headliners
Motörhead
Tata Bojs
David Koller

Festival 2005 headliners
The Wailers
Rachid Taha
Dog Eat Dog
Senor Coconut
The Dhol Foundation
The Slackers
Superhiks
Blackfire
Yat-kha
Fanfare Savale
Brainless Wankers
Kultur Shock

Festival 2006 headliners
Living Colour
Killing Joke
The Presidents of The USA
Hedningarna
The Dhol Foundation
MTO
The Plastic People of the Universe
Eva Pilarová
Monkey Business
Support Lesbiens

Festival 2007 headliners
The Young Gods
Billy Gould and Harmful
The Race
New York Ska Ensemble
Tanya Stephens
The Dhol Foundation

Festival 2008 headliners
The Subways
Stephen Marley
Soulfly
Voodoo Glow Skulls
Shelter
Ungdomskulen
Dub Trio
The Sex Pistols Experience

Festival 2009 headliners
Primal Scream
Anti-Flag
Cavalera Conspiracy
Candie Payne
Enter Shikari
The International Noise Conspiracy
Pro-Pain
The Plastic People of the Universe
The Tower of Dudes
Lord Bishop Rock
Tagada Jones
Trunk Show
Eva Pilarová
Monkey Business

Festival 2010 headliners

Manic Street Preachers
Rachid Taha
Senser
Dubioza Kolektiv
Irie Révoltés
Elvis Jackson
The Flying Eyes
Trunk Show
The Tower of Dudes
Monkey Business
The Plastic People of the Universe

Festival 2011 headliners
Iggy and the Stooges
The Plastic People of the Universe
Garage with Tony Ducháček
Skindred
Brian "Head" Welch
Petr Váša & Ty Syčáci
Monkey Business

Festival 2012 headliners
John Cale from The Velvet Underground
The Plastic People of the Universe
Jessie Evans
Anti-Flag
Korn
dEUS
Yellowcard
Jaroslav Hutka
Garage with Tony Ducháček
Vladimír Merta
Petr Váša & Ty Syčáci
Velvet Underground Revival Band
Milan Smrčka a.k.a. Záviš

References

External links
 Official site of the festival
 https://web.archive.org/web/20050830001033/http://trutnov.openair.cz/

Rock festivals in the Czech Republic
Music festivals established in 1987
Trutnov